Shooting Star is the debut studio album by Australian recording artist Rachael Leahcar, who finished third on the first season of  The Voice Australia. The album was released on 13 July 2012, through Universal Music Australia. It features songs Leahcar performed on The Voice, two original songs, as well as newly recorded covers. Leahcar promoted the album with an in-store appearance at Westfield Marion in Oaklands Park, South Australia, where she signed copies of the album and performed the songs "La Vie en rose" and "Shooting Star". The album debuted at number five on the ARIA Albums Chart.

Background
After finishing third in the first season of The Voice Australia in 2012, Leahcar signed a recording contract with Universal Music Australia. On 26 June 2012 it was announced that Leahcar would be  releasing their debut studio albums on the 13 July 2012 along with Darren Percival and Sarah De Bono.

Release and promotion

Singles
The album's lead single "Coming Home Again" was released on 29 June 2012. It was written by Jud Friedman, Allan Rich and Marco Marinangeli. It was originally going to be Leahcar's winners single.

Tour
In November 2013 Leahcar supported her Coach on The Voice Delta Goodrem as her opening act on Goodrem's album launch tour An Evening with Delta: The Top of My World Shows. This tour was supporting the release of Goodrem's 4th studio album Child of the Universe. The tour commenced in Brisbane on 27 October 2012 and concluded in Melbourne on 8 November 2012.

Track listing

Charts

Weekly charts

Year-end charts

Release history

References

Rachael Leahcar albums
Universal Music Australia albums
2012 debut albums